Francesco Carrone (1938 - 1975), also known as "Buzzy" or "Buzz", was an American Gambino crime family associate. He was a close friend of Thomas Agro and Peter Calabrese.

Early life
Born in the Little Italy section of Manhattan, Carrone was nicknamed "Buzz" because of his violent temper. He joined the Gambino family as an associate, working under caporegime Thomas Agro, and later Carmine Fatico, in the Bergin Hunt and Fish Club crew.  He was involved in bank robbery and hijacking as a "stick up man". Carrone also trafficked small shipments of cocaine, marijuana and Quaaludes in Fort Lauderdale, Florida.
 
His right eye was gouged or shot out, severing nerve endings and paralyzing facial muscles and giving the impression that half of his face was smiling. It is unclear how or who was responsible for Carrone losing his eye. As a result of the injury, he suffered from depth perception issues in the years following his accident. Fellow crew member Joseph Ianuzzi described Carrone before his disfigurement as "a tall and handsome Italian". 

Carrone suffered from narcissistic personality disorder, borderline personality disorder and antisocial personality disorder. After his disfigurement, Carrone's condition was made worse by a severe case of posttraumatic stress disorder.

Being put on the shelf
Carrone was exiled from his crew and the Gambino family for robbing banks without Fatico's permission. Carrone now started robbing banks on his own. In May 1972 Federal Bureau of Investigation (FBI) Special Agents Patrick Colgan and Thomas D'Onofrio were looking for Carrone about a string of bank robberies in New York. A number of bank tellers implicated Carrone, describing him as  "bizarre looking man with one eye and a gun". One day the two agents spotted Carrone exiting an apartment building in Little Italy. Carrone saw the agents and drove off. As the agents approached children crossing at a cross walk, they attempted to slow down, but their brakes failed. Carrone sped away, but immediately plowed into a woman's car. When the agents got out of their car, a bystander told them that Carrone was hiding under the steering wheel in his vehicle. Almost immediately, Carrone popped out and starting firing at the agents. In the confusion, Carrone managed to escape.

Angering the Mob
After the FBI shootout, FBI supervisor John Good approached Fatico and told him to give up Carrone. Fatico could not comply because Carrone had fled to Boston. This caused a period of major FBI harassment brought on by Carrone shooting at the FBI agents. Furious at the trouble that Carrone had caused the Gambino family, Fatico put a contract on Carrone. Fatico allegedly offered to induct anyone who murdered Carrone into the Gambino family. However, Carrone remained a fugitive. He was also featured as a fugitive on the television program America's Most Wanted, but no one turned him in.

Capture in Massachusetts
In 1974, low on money, Carrone robbed a bank in East Boston, Massachusetts in the Financial District, Boston, Massachusetts. However, a silent alarm went off and Massachusetts state police troopers were soon chasing him. The troopers chased Carrone into some nearby woods.  One trooper, tiptoeing through some heavy underbrush, suddenly heard three loud clicks behind him. He turned with his gun drawn and saw Carrone standing there, his gun pointed at the trooper's head; Carrone was out of ammunition, however. As the trooper leveled his own gun at Carrone, Carrone pleaded with the trooper, "Do it". The trooper spared Carrone's life and arrested him.

Time in prison
Carrone was sent to prison at Massachusetts Correctional Institution - Cedar Junction in Walpole, Massachusetts. Carrone feared that he would be murdered by his former associates in the Gambino family, and so suffered from insomnia brought on by anxiety and chronic fatigue syndrome.

In 1975, Carrone died in prison of an undiagnosed supraventricular tachycardia brought on by hypertension, starvation, and malnourishment.

References
 Joe Dogs: The Life and Crimes of a Gangster, by Joe Dogs Iannuzzi
 Goombata: The Improbable Rise and Fall of John Gotti and his Gang, by John Cummings and Ernest Volkman

1938 births
1975 deaths
American gangsters of Italian descent
Gambino crime family
People from Queens, New York
People with antisocial personality disorder
People with narcissistic personality disorder
People with borderline personality disorder
People with chronic fatigue syndrome
Deaths from hypertension
Bank robbers
People with post-traumatic stress disorder